Quincy Obinna Amarikwa (born October 29, 1987) is an American soccer player.

Career

College and Amateur
Amarikwa attended Liberty High School. He was a member of the Bakersfield Alliance club soccer team and played college soccer at UC Davis. In 2008, he led the team to the second round of the NCAA Tournament for the first time in school history.

During his college years, Amarikwa also played with Bakersfield Brigade in the USL Premier Development League.

Professional
Amarikwa was drafted in the third round of the 2009 MLS SuperDraft by San Jose Earthquakes. He made his professional debut in San Jose's first game of the 2009 MLS season against the New England Revolution and scored his first MLS goal on October 7 against FC Dallas.

After 25 games for San Jose and one goal, he was traded to Colorado Rapids in April 2010 in exchange for a second-round selection in the 2012 MLS SuperDraft. Amarikwa made 31 league appearances for Colorado scoring three goals and was a member of the side that captured the 2010 MLS Cup.

Amarikwa was waived by Colorado in June 2012. Shortly thereafter his rights were claimed through waivers by the New York Red Bulls. He spent two weeks training with New York but never signed, instead, New York traded Amarikwa to Toronto FC for a conditional draft pick on July 21. He made his league debut for Toronto in a 2–0 home defeat to Houston Dynamo on July 28. Amarikwa scored his first goal for Toronto in CONCACAF Champions League play against Santos Laguna in a 3–1 home defeat.

In February 2013, Amarikwa was acquired by Chicago Fire in exchange for a first-round selection in the 2014 MLS Supplemental Draft.

In June 2015, Chicago Fire traded Amarikwa to San Jose Earthquakes in exchange for defender Ty Harden. He scored two goals in four minutes in his second Earthquakes appearance during the California Clásico against the LA Galaxy. Amarikwa was sidelined for the rest of the 2016 season and for the first half of the 2017 season after suffering a knee injury on September 24, 2016, against Sporting Kansas City. He made his return to the team on July 14, 2017, in a friendly match against Eintracht Frankfurt, scoring a penalty kick twelve minutes after substituting in for Simon Dawkins and securing San Jose's 4–1 victory. On October 14, 2017, he was nominated for the MLS Comeback Player of the Year Award.

On August 8, 2018, Amarikwa was traded by the Earthquakes to Montreal Impact in exchange for Dominic Oduro. He made his debut for Montreal on August 11, 2018, in a game against Real Salt Lake.

On March 1, 2019, after speculation and Amarikwa appearing at D.C. United practices, Quincy Amarikwa signed with D.C. United. Amarikwa scored his first goal for D.C. United in a friendly against Real Betis on May 22, 2019. Amarikwa then scored his first D.C. United MLS goal against the New England Revolution on July 12, 2019. His goal equalized the game 2-2. His contract with D.C. United ran out after the 2019 season.

On September 1, 2020, Amarikwa signed with USL Championship side Las Vegas Lights.

On August 11, 2021, Amarikwa joined Oakland Roots SC.

Personal life

Amarikwa is a member of the UC Davis Hall of Fame. While studying there, Quincy Amarikwa met his wife Sirena Amarikwa; they were engaged in 2016 while Sirena was pursuing her professional track career, and wed in January 2017. They have two sons, Sir Amarikwa and Lord Amarikwa.

Amarikwa and Ross LaBauex co-own a brand called Perfect Soccer, a Black news source for soccer. He is also Founder and Director of Strategic Partnerships for Black Players for Change, serving as interim director when the organisation was launched.

Honors

Colorado Rapids
Major League Soccer MLS Cup (1): 2010

Statistics
Statistics accurate as of April 14, 2018.

References

External links
 

1987 births
Living people
Soccer players from California
American expatriate soccer players
American sportspeople of Nigerian descent
UC Davis Aggies men's soccer players
Bakersfield Brigade players
San Jose Earthquakes players
Colorado Rapids players
Toronto FC players
Chicago Fire FC players
CF Montréal players
D.C. United players
Las Vegas Lights FC players
Oakland Roots SC players
University of California, Davis alumni
Expatriate soccer players in Canada
USL League Two players
Major League Soccer players
San Jose Earthquakes draft picks
Sportspeople from Bakersfield, California
American soccer players
Association football forwards